Steven Fallon (born 8 May 1979) is a Scottish footballer who played as a defender in the Scottish Football League for Stenhousemuir, Arbroath and Queen's Park. Stevie has now retired as a football player and moved into coaching with Forfar Athletic.

Career
Steven Fallon was born in Paisley and began his career as a youth player with Dundee United, turning professional in July 1995. His six-year spell with the club was disrupted by injuries; he failed to make a competitive first team appearance, although he did appear in friendly matches and was an unused substitute for a UEFA Cup tie against CE Principat in July 1997. He spent the last few months of his Dundee United career on loan at Stenhousemuir, playing three times. Following his release in May 2001, Fallon signed for Arbroath, featuring in only a handful of matches after spending much of the season injured. He left Arbroath in 2002 and joined Queen's Park, where he would appear in over fifty league games over a two-year period.

In 2004, Fallon returned to Stenhousemuir for a year, featuring in most of the league campaign. He left the club in 2005 and signed for junior club Dundee North End. In 2008, Fallon joined Tayport before signing for St Andrews United in October of that year.

On 7 March 2018, Fallon become assistant manager at Broughty Athletic.

Since then Steven has been coaching at St Andrews United until 2022 he moved to Forfar Athletic as a football assistant manager at Station Park, Forfar.

Career statistics
Senior career statistics only:

External links

References

1979 births
Living people
Footballers from Paisley, Renfrewshire
Scottish footballers
Dundee United F.C. players
Stenhousemuir F.C. players
Arbroath F.C. players
Queen's Park F.C. players
Dundee North End F.C. players
St Andrews United F.C. players
Tayport F.C. players
Scottish Football League players
Scottish Junior Football Association players
Association football defenders